The Jasenička river (Serbian: Јасеничка река / Jasenička reka) is a river in eastern Serbia, a 55 km-long right tributary to the Danube.

The Jasenička reka originates on the eastern slopes of the meridionally elongated Deli Jovan mountain in the Carpathian region of the eastern Serbia. The river springs out under the mountain's highest peak, Crni vrh (Black peak) and flows to the east, originally under the name of Vrelska reka. The area is sparsely populated (villages of Popovica and Trnjane).

The river enters the Negotin Valley region, between the villages of Karbulovo and Jasenica, the river turns north, and from this point it is generally known as the Jasenička reka. The river forms an arc to the north, begins to flow to the south at the village of Miloševo and after few kilometers reaches to town of Negotin, the regional center of the Negotin Valley. The Jasenička reka then turns east, passes next to the dual village of Kobišnica-Bukovče and empties into the Danube just some 1.5 km north of the mouth of the river Timok.

See also 
 List of rivers of Serbia
 Jasenica

Rivers of Serbia
Tributaries of the Danube
Timok Valley